Emerging Ireland is an Irish rugby union team that represents Ireland in the World Rugby Nations Cup.

History

2013 Tbilisi Cup
The team was created to offer Tier 1 level opposition for Tier 2 sides in the IRB Tbilisi Cup, held in Tbilisi, Georgia. Allen Clarke, Ian Costello and Joey Miles managed the team, with Rhys Ruddock as captain.

In Emerging Ireland's opening match, they faced hosts Georgia. This match was won by the Emerging side 20–15 in their first ever game. In their second match, South Africa President's XV beat Emerging Ireland 19–8, before Emerging Ireland beat Uruguay 42–33 on 16 June 2013 to secure a second-place finish in the tournament.

The squad for the tournament was named on 19 May 2013. The initial squad featured four internationally capped players; Michael Bent, Seán Cronin, Ian Keatley and Rhys Ruddock the captain. However, Cronin was called up to the senior squad on 26 May 2013, thus lowering the international players from four to three. The remaining twenty three players, had, at the time, not played for Ireland internationally or at test level.

2014 IRB Nations Cup
On 1 April 2014, it was announced that Emerging Ireland would take part in the 2014 edition of the IRB Nations Cup in Bucharest, Romania. Dan McFarland, Connacht assistant coach at the time, was appointed as head coach and Ulster backs coach, Neil Doak was chosen to assist him.

In the first game of the cup Emerging Ireland beat Russia by a score of 66–0 at 45 minutes into the game, when it was stopped by the referee, Ian Davies, because of a storm and fears for the players safety. The match included 10 tries,3 of those from Andrew Conway. This was Emerging Ireland's largest ever win in international rugby. Dan McFarland's side beat Uruguay 51–3 in their second game to set up the last game against Romania as a title decider. This game turned out to be the closest of all their games but Emerging Ireland still ran out at 31–10 winners to secure the IRB nations cup with 3 bonus point victories.

2015 Tbilisi Cup
Emerging Ireland won the 2015 Tbilisi Cup tournament with three from three victories, taking the Tbilisi Cup for their first ever time.

2022 South Africa Tour
Simon Easterby was appointed head coach of the Emerging Ireland squad for their three fixtures against South African Currie Cup sides in Autumn 2022. Ireland won their first match of the tour beating the Griquas 54–7 at Toyota Stadium. They went on to win their second match of the tour with a 28–24 victory over the Pumas. Emerging Ireland completed a sweep of their tour of South Africa on 9 October  with a 21–14 win over the Cheetahs.

Statistics

Overall

Up to date as of 9 October 2022

Honours

World Rugby Nations Cup
Winners: 1 (2014)
World Rugby Tbilisi Cup
Winners: 1 (2015)
Runners-Up: 1 (2013)

Current squad
Emerging Ireland 35-man squad for the Toyota Challenge was announced on 14 September 2022. Caps listed are those earned playing for the Ireland national rugby union team. 

Head Coach: Simon Easterby

Head coaches and statistics
Correct as of 5 October 2022

See also
 Ireland national rugby union team
 Ireland Wolfhounds
 Ireland national under-20 rugby union team
 IRB Tbilisi Cup
 IRB Nations Cup

References

Emerging